Kyn is a rural locality (a settlement) in Lysva, Perm Krai, Russia. The population was 1,949 as of 2010. There are 22 streets.

It arose at the beginning of the XX century as a settlement near the railway station. The name is given for the nearby rural locality (selo) of Kyn.

Geography 
Kyn is located 75 km southeast of Lysva (the district's administrative centre) by road.

References 

Rural localities in Perm Krai